Albanian Braille is the braille alphabet for writing the Albanian language. Like other braille alphabets for languages written in the Latin script, the simple Latin letters are all assigned values based on international braille.

Alphabet 

As in several other braille alphabets, letters and digraphs are frequently derived by adding a dot 6 or reversing the base letter.

Punctuation

Formatting

References
World Braille Usage, UNESCO, 2013
Shefik Osmani, 1983, Fjalor i Pedagogjisë, Tiranë.

External links
Braille at Albanian Wikipedia

French-ordered braille alphabets
Albanian language